The South African Jewish Board of Deputies is an organisation formed in 1912 from the merger of the Board for the Transvaal and the Board for the Cape. It serves as the central representative institution of most of the country's Hebrew congregations, Jewish societies, and institutions.

In his address to the 2015 Biennial National Conference of the South African Jewish Board of Deputies, South African President Jacob Zuma credited the South African Jewish community's historical role in resisting apartheid.

History
The South African Jewish Board of Deputies officially condemned apartheid in 1985, having previously maintained a neutral position. As early as the late 1950s, Jewish anti-apartheid activists had brought anti-apartheid resolutions to the Board of Deputies that were routinely voted down.

References 

Jewish organisations based in South Africa
Jewish South African history